Stanwell is a village in England.

Stanwell may also refer to:

Places
 Stanwell, Queensland, a town in Australia
 Stanwell (Penarth electoral ward), an electoral ward in the Vale of Glamorgan, Wales
 Stanwell Moor
 Stanwell Park, New South Wales
 Stanwell Tops, New South Wales

Other
 Stanwell Power Station, Stanwell, Queensland
 Stanwell Corporation, and electricity provider in Queensland
 Stanwell School, Penarth, Wales
 Stanwell Place, a house in Middlesex, England